Osira is a fictional character in the DC Comics book Wonder Woman. She first appeared in Wonder Woman #231.

Fictional character biography

Pre-Crisis history
Osira was first introduced as an alien who crash-landed on Earth centuries ago. She and her husband Hefnakhti were worshipped as gods by the ancient Egyptians for their advanced technology and knowledge of irrigation. Egyptian pyramids were erected in their honor. They brought peace to Egypt but an old high priest called Anankh spoke against the couple as their sense of peace meant taking away the people's free will. Anankh trapped Osira and Hefnakhti in a pyramid, where they remained until 1942. Two opposing tanks accidentally blasted the pyramid open and Osira was released. Osira discovered that Hefnakhti had expended too much of his alien energy trying to escape the pyramid and thus he didn't have enough energy to sleep throughout the centuries and died.

Determined to bring about peace to the world once more, Osira took away the free will of the world's leaders and forced them into peace negotiations. Seeing the truth behind Osira's actions, Wonder Woman attempted to stop Osira and bring about free will to the world again. Osira's alien powers were too much for Wonder Woman though and Wonder Woman became a prisoner of Osira's. Osira then noted that Steve Trevor looked exactly like her now dead husband and proceeded to hypnotize him into thinking that he truly was Hefnakhti. Realizing this, Wonder Woman escaped her prison and battled Osira again. The spirit of Hefnakhti appeared to Osira during the battle and convinced her to stop the battle, leaving with him in peace. Thus the two disappeared, leaving Wonder Woman and Steve Trevor in a world at war again.

"One Year Later"
In conjunction with DC's "One Year Later" event, Osira appeared for the first time in Post-Crisis history. She was shown battling Donna Troy (who had taken over the title of Wonder Woman) and Cassie Sandsmark, the current Wonder Girl. As before, she was shown in an energy pyramid and emitted energy bolts from her hands.

Powers and abilities
Osira is able to shoot powerful force blasts from her hands and create a force shield around her body. Her power needs recharging and can be depleted.

See also
 List of Wonder Woman enemies

Comics characters introduced in 1977
DC Comics extraterrestrial supervillains
DC Comics female supervillains
DC Comics deities
DC Comics aliens
DC Comics characters who have mental powers
DC Comics characters with superhuman strength
Characters created by Bob Brown
Fictional goddesses 
Fictional characters with energy-manipulation abilities